Taylor Allen Rogers (born December 17, 1990) is an American professional baseball pitcher for the San Francisco Giants of Major League Baseball (MLB). He has previously played in MLB for the Minnesota Twins, San Diego Padres, and Milwaukee Brewers. Rogers played college baseball at the University of Kentucky, and was selected by the Twins in the 11th round of the 2012 MLB draft. He was named an All-Star in 2021.

Early life
Rogers attended Chatfield Senior High School in Littleton, Colorado, playing for both the baseball team and the basketball team. In 2008 he was 5=2 with a 1.98 ERA, and struck out 82 batters in 53 innings. He was named first-team All-State. In 2009, he was named All-Region.

College career
The Baltimore Orioles selected him in the 37th round of the 2009 Major League Baseball draft. He did not sign with the Orioles, and instead attended the University of Kentucky to play college baseball for the Kentucky Wildcats. In 2010, he tied for the Southeastern Conference lead in losses (7) and runs allowed (68), as he went 4–7 with a 6.40 ERA.

In 2011, Rogers tied for second in the Southeastern Conference in losses (7), and was third-highest in runs allowed (56). After the 2011 season, he played collegiate summer baseball with the Harwich Mariners of the Cape Cod Baseball League, was 2-3 with a 1.76 ERA and an 0.946 WHIP in six starts, and was named a league all-star. In 2012, he was 6-4 and was fourth in the Southeastern Conference in runs allowed (45) and 11th in strikeouts (84). Pitching in college from 2010–12, he was 13–18 with a 5.35 ERA.

Professional career

Draft and minor leagues

After his junior season at Kentucky, the Minnesota Twins selected Rogers in the 11th round of the 2012 MLB draft. Rogers signed with the Twins and made his professional debut that season with the Elizabethton Twins, and also played for the Beloit Snappers. In 15 games (10 starts) between both teams, he was 4–3 with a 2.27 ERA. 

Rogers started 2013 with the Cedar Rapids Kernels, and was promoted to the Fort Myers Miracle during the season, with whom his 11 wins were third in the Florida State League and his three complete games and two shutouts led the league. In 25 games between the two clubs, 24 of which were starts, Rogers was 11–7 with a 2.88 ERA. He was named a Florida State League post-season All Star.

In 2014 he pitched for the New Britain Rock Cats, with whom he compiled an 11–6 record with a 3.29 ERA in 24 games started in which he pitched 145 innings (6th in the Eastern League) and had 113 strikeouts (5th), with his 11 wins tied for third in the league. He was named an Eastern League mid-season All Star. 

In 2015 he played for the Rochester Red Wings, with whom he posted an 11–12 record with a 3.98 ERA in 28 games (27 starts; tied for the International League lead) covering 174 innings (2nd) with 126 strikeouts (2nd), with his 11 wins tied for third in the league. He was named an International League mid-season All Star. The Twins added Rogers to their 40-man roster after the 2015 season. He began 2016 with Rochester.

Minnesota Twins (2016–2021)
Rogers was called up to the major leagues on April 13, 2016, and he made his major league debut the next day. He was optioned to Rochester on April 19, and recalled to Minnesota on May 17. After his May 17 promotion, he spent the rest of the season with Minnesota, going 3–1 with a 3.96 ERA in 57 relief appearances covering 61.1 innings in which he struck out 64 batters.

Rogers spent all of the 2017 season with the Twins, pitching to a 7–3 record, a 3.07 ERA, and a 1.31 WHIP in  innings pitched, with a major-league-leading 30 holds. In the 2018 season, Rogers appeared in 72 games (9th in the AL) for Minnesota, pitching to a 1–2 record with two saves in  innings in which he struck out 75 batters, and had a WHIP of 0.951. 

In 2019, Rogers began as a setup man before being installed as the closer. He was 2-4 and recorded 30 saves (4th in the AL) in 36 opportunities with an ERA of 2.61, striking out 90 batters in 69 innings (11.7 strikeouts/9 innings), allowed 1.4 walks per 9 innings (among the lowest 2% in the major leagues), and had a WHIP of 1.000.  He received the Twins Joseph W. Haynes Pitcher of the Year Award. In 2020, Rogers was 2–4 with nine saves (5th in the AL) and a 4.05 ERA in 21 games, in 20 innings in which he struck out 24 batters while walking four batters. 

On July 12, 2021, Rogers was named to the 2021 All-Star Game. For the 2021 season, he was 2-4 with 9 saves and a 3.35 ERA, as in 40.1 innings he struck out 59 batters (13.2 strikeouts/9 innings), while allowing only 1.8 walks/9 innings.

San Diego Padres (2022)
On April 7, 2022, the Twins traded Rogers, Brent Rooker, and cash considerations to the San Diego Padres in exchange for Chris Paddack, Emilio Pagán, and a player to be named later. Minor leaguer Brayan Medina was sent to the Twins as the player to be named later on April 21.

Rogers became the Padres closer, but was removed from the role in late July after two consecutive blown saves.

Milwaukee Brewers (2022)
On August 1, 2022, the Padres traded Rogers, Dinelson Lamet, Esteury Ruiz, and Robert Gasser to the Milwaukee Brewers for Josh Hader.

In 2022 between the two teams he was 4-8 with 31 saves (5th in the NL) with a 4.76 ERA, and pitched in 66 games (10th), as in 64.1 innings he struck out 84 batters (11.8 strikeouts/9 innings). He relied 63% of the time on an 81 mph slider (against which batters hit .177, and left-handed batters hit .102), and 36% of the time on a 94 mph sinker (against which batters hit .304, and left-handed batters hit .250).

San Francisco Giants
On December 28, 2022, Rogers signed a three-year, $33 million contract with the San Francisco Giants.

Personal life
Taylor Rogers' younger identical mirror image twin brother, Tyler, is also a pitcher for the San Francisco Giants. The brothers became the 5th set of twins to play in MLB.

References

External links

Kentucky Wildcats bio

1990 births
Living people
Sportspeople from Littleton, Colorado
Baseball players from Colorado
American League All-Stars
Major League Baseball pitchers
Minnesota Twins players
San Diego Padres players
Milwaukee Brewers players
Kentucky Wildcats baseball players
Harwich Mariners players
Elizabethton Twins players
Beloit Snappers players
Cedar Rapids Kernels players
Fort Myers Miracle players
New Britain Rock Cats players
Salt River Rafters players
Rochester Red Wings players
Scottsdale Scorpions players
Identical twins
Twin sportspeople
American twins